Colonel Maurice Rhynd Dickson    (2 January 1882 – 10 January 1940) was a Scottish sportsman who represented his country in both cricket and rugby union.

Education
Dickson was educated at Marlborough College and went on to read for his bachelor's degree at Merton College, Oxford, from 1900 to 1903.

Career
In all but two of Dickson's 13 first-class appearances for Scotland, he was captain. He made his first-class debut against Joe Darling's Australian team in 1905 and scored an unbeaten 62 in the fourth innings. A right-handed batsman, he held on in the dying overs with number eleven Frederick Bull to secure a draw.

The following year he had another good performance against a touring team, this time the West Indies, with contributions of 36 and 81.

When Australia played Scotland at Edinburgh again in 1912, Dickson made his highest score of 98, missing out on a century when he was bowled by Roy Minnett. On this occasion, Australia won by 296 runs.

He took only one wicket in his career, which was Irish batsman Bob Lambert.

Dickson was capped just once for the Scotland national rugby union team, when he appeared as a forward in a six-point loss to Ireland at Inverleith during the 1905 Home Nations Championship.

Military service

During World War I, Dickson served with the Royal Scots Fusiliers. He was awarded the Distinguished Service Order "for distinguished service in connection with Military Operations in Salonika" in the King's 1918 Birthday Honours. He was also made an Officer of the Legion of Honour.

See also
 List of Scottish cricket and rugby union players

References

External links
Cricinfo: Maurice Dickson
Scrum: Maurice Dickson

1882 births
1940 deaths
Alumni of Merton College, Oxford
British Army personnel of World War I
Companions of the Distinguished Service Order
Cricketers from Angus, Scotland
Recipients of the Legion of Honour
Royal Scots Fusiliers officers
Rugby union players from Angus, Scotland
Scotland international rugby union players
Scottish cricketers
Scottish rugby union players